Talgsjøen is a small channel or fjord beyond Halsa Fjord between the municipalities of Kristiansund and Aure in Møre og Romsdal county, Norway.

The ferry connection from Seivika on the island of Nordlandet in Kristiansund and Tømmervåg on the island of Tustna in Aure crosses Talgsjøen.

References

External links
Talgsjøen at Norgeskart
Talgsjøen map

Kristiansund
Aure, Norway